6 Derrty Hits is an EP by rapper Nelly. It includes songs from Country Grammar, Nellyville, and Brass Knuckles.

Track listing

Charts

2008 EPs
Nelly albums
Hip hop EPs
2008 compilation albums
Hip hop compilation albums
Universal Records EPs